Chlosyne fulvia, the Fulvia checkerspot, is a butterfly of the family Nymphalidae. It is found in North America from Kansas, Colorado, southern Utah and Arizona south to central Mexico.

The wingspan is 32–50 mm. Adults feed on flower nectar.

The larvae feed on Castilleja integra and Castilleja lanata. They feed on the leaves and flowers of their host plant. Young larvae live together in a loose web. Third-instar larvae hibernate.

Subspecies
Chlosyne fulvia fulvia (Texas)
Chlosyne fulvia coronado (Smith & Brock, 1988) (Arizona)

References

fulvia
Taxa named by William Henry Edwards
Butterflies described in 1879
Butterflies of North America